Lams or LAMS may refer to:

People 
 Lams, members of a family having the Cantonese surname Lam (林), also romanized as Lin
 Lams, members of a family having the Cantonese surname Lam (蓝), also romanized as Lan

Other uses 
 LAMS (Learning Activity Management System), an open source software system
 Lams, a ship between John Laurens and Alexander Hamilton, popularized by fans of the 2015 musical Hamilton
 Lehigh Acres Middle School, a public school in Lee County, Florida

See also
 Lam (disambiguation)
 Iams